Kreutz Creek is a  tributary of the Susquehanna River in York County, Pennsylvania in the United States.

Kreutz Creek joins the Susquehanna River at the borough of Wrightsville.

Variant names
According to the Geographic Names Information System, Kreutz Creek has also been known historically as:
Creitz Creek
Kreuztz Creek

See also
List of rivers of Pennsylvania

References

Rivers of York County, Pennsylvania
Rivers of Pennsylvania
Tributaries of the Susquehanna River